The N5 or National Highway 5 is a national highway in Ghana that begins at Adomi in the Eastern region and runs east to Ho, where it intersects with the R26, which travels north to reconnect with the N2. At Ho, the N5 also intersects with the R10 and R55. The N5 spans a distance of 40 kilometers (25 miles).

Route
Major towns and cities along the route of the N5 include Juapong, Sokode-Etoe, and Ho.

See also 
Ghana Road Network

References

Roads in Ghana